Results from the 1998 Buenos Aires Grand Prix held at Buenos Aires on November 8, 1998, in the Autódromo Oscar Alfredo Gálvez.

Classification 

Buenos Aires Grand Prix
1998 in motorsport
1998 in Argentine motorsport
November 1998 sports events in South America